Virunnukari is a 1969 Indian Malayalam-language film, directed and produced by P. Venu. The film stars Prem Nazir, Madhu, Sheela and Usha.

Cast

Prem Nazir as Madhavankutty
Madhu as Sethu
Sheela as Radha
Jayabharathi as Shantha
Ambika as Malathi
K. P. Ummer as Surendran
Adoor Bhasi as Swami
Sankaradi
Sreelatha Namboothiri as Sreelatha
T. R. Omana as Surendran's mother
T. S. Muthaiah as Panikkar
Abbas (Old)
Adoor Bhavani as Kalyani
Kaduvakulam Antony as Paramu
Lakshmi (Old) as Usha
M. S. Namboothiri as Sankunni Menon
Nellikode Bhaskaran as Raman Nair
Vidhubala as Mohanam
P. J. Antony as Raghava Menon master
Sukumari as Kamakshiyamma
P. R. Menon
Vidhubala as Swami's daughter

Soundtrack
The music was composed by M. S. Baburaj and the lyrics were written by P. Bhaskaran.

References

External links
 

1969 films
1960s Malayalam-language films
Films directed by P. Venu
Films scored by M. S. Baburaj